Robert Blum (1807–1848) was a German poet and revolutionist.

Robert Blum may also refer to:

 Robert Blum (composer) (1900–1994), Swiss composer and conductor
 Robert Blum (fencer) (1928–2022), American fencer
 Robert Frederick Blum (1857–1903), American artist